Mogotio Constituency is an electoral constituency in Baringo County, Kenya. It is one of six constituencies in the county and was one of two constituencies of the former Koibatek District. It was established before the 1997 elections. There are 12 wards, all electing councillors for the Koibatek County Council.

Members of Parliament

Wards 

|

References 

Constituencies in Baringo County
Constituencies in Rift Valley Province
1997 establishments in Kenya
Constituencies established in 1997